Berezovka is a rural locality (a settlement) in Barnaul, Altai Krai, Russia. The population was 537 as of 2013. There are 12 streets.

Geography 
Berezovka is located 33 km west of Barnaul by road. Novomikhaylovka is the nearest rural locality.

References 

Rural localities in Barnaul urban okrug